Wagang or Wagan is a village located to the east of Lae in Burum-Kwat Rural LLG, Morobe Province, Papua New Guinea.

References

External links
Map of villages in the area

Populated places in Morobe Province